Mona Font is both a Japanese proportional pixel font for the X Window System, derived from the Shinonome raster font family, and a TrueType font. It aims to represent Shift JIS art graphics properly, almost all of which require the MS PGothic font. Mona is named after Mona, a character-based mascot of 2channel.

Mona uses glyphs from Shinonome (東雲) version 0.9.9 (Gothic) for embedded bitmaps. In version 2.30-pre, it incorporated outline from Kochi-Gothic. However, it was changed to Kochi-substitute in 2.30-pre2 after discovering the copyright violation in Kochi font. Glyphs share the characteristics of MS PGothic.

Mona supports the following code pages: 1252 (Latin 1), 1250 (Latin 2: East Europe), 1251 (Cyrillic), 1253 (Greek), 932 (JIS/Japan), 737 (Greek; former 437G), 437 (US).

mona-outline
mona-outline version 2.30pre2 is included with the source code for the Mona Font source package, which consists of a subset of glyphs found in Mona. The OpenType layout table supports standard ligatures in the default language. When the font is viewed under Windows Font Viewer, a horizontal stroke overlays the glyph.

mona-outline supports the following code pages: 932 (JIS/Japan), 437 (US).

IPA monafont
IPA monafont is an extension of IPA Font (IPAフォント), Sazanami Font (さざなみフォント), Mona Font (モナーフォント), M+ Fonts (M+フォント) created by Jun Kobayashi, which consists of a family of fonts:
IPAMonaGothic (IPA モナー ゴシック)
IPAMonaMincho (IPA モナー 明朝)
IPAMonaPGothic (IPA モナー P ゴシック)
IPAMonaPMincho (IPA モナー P 明朝)
IPAMonaUIGothic (IPA モナー UI ゴシック)

The IPA monafont family supports following the code pages: 1252 (Latin 1), 1251 (Cyrillic), 932 (JIS/Japan), 950 (Big-5), Macintosh Character Set (US Roman), Windows OEM Character Set, 866 (MS-DOS Russian), 865 (MS-DOS Nordic), 863 (MS-DOS Canadian French), 861 (MS-DOS Icelandic), 860 (MS-DOS Portuguese), 855 (IBM Cyrillic; primary Russian), 437 (US).

Glyphs for CJK ideographs are reworked to look more like Arial Unicode MS, while sub-glyphs for these characters are repositioned and rescaled. Similar to the MS Gothic and MS Mincho font families, reverse solidus glyph uses a yen sign instead of a backslash. A similar non-standard substitution can be found in the Gulim and Dotum font families.

Font statistics

Note: Some glyphs representing non-whitespace characters are blank.

See also
 List of CJK fonts

References

External links
Mona Font at SourceForge
IPA monafont

2channel
CJK typefaces